Rajni Tiwari (born 27 July 1973) is an Indian politician, a Minister of State in the Government of Uttar Pradesh and a member of the 18th Legislative Assembly. She represents the Shahabad constituency and is a member of the Bhartiya Janta Party.

Early life and education
Tiwari was born on 27 July 1973 to Krishna Prasad Agnihotri in Bilgram in Hardoi district. She graduated with a Bachelor of Arts from Arya Kanya Degree College, Hardoi, Kanpur University. Tiwari is an agriculturalist and businesswoman by profession.

Personal life
Tiwari was married to Upendra Tiwari, with whom she has a son and a daughter. Upendra Tiwari was an MLA from Bilgram constituency. He died in 2007 which left the Bilgram constituency seat vacant. Tiwari was elected as an MLA in the 2008 by-polls.

Positions held

See also
Government of Uttar Pradesh
Sixteenth Legislative Assembly of Uttar Pradesh
Fifteenth Legislative Assembly of Uttar Pradesh
Uttar Pradesh Legislative Assembly
Bhartiya Janta Party

References

1973 births
Living people
Women in Uttar Pradesh politics
Bharatiya Janata Party politicians from Uttar Pradesh
Uttar Pradesh MLAs 2017–2022
21st-century Indian women politicians
21st-century Indian politicians
Uttar Pradesh MLAs 2022–2027